Events in the year 1985 in Portugal.

Incumbents
President: António Ramalho Eanes
Prime Minister: Mário Soares (until 6 November); Aníbal Cavaco Silva

Events
 2 February – Sopormetal, a company supplying brazing materials, silver and copper brazing solders, is founded.
11 September – Moimenta-Alcafache train crash
6 October – Portuguese legislative election, 1985

Arts and entertainment
Portugal in the Eurovision Song Contest 1985
First occurrence of the Festroia International Film Festival

Sports
21 April – 1985 Portuguese Grand Prix (Formula One)
CD Rabo de Peixe founded
Juve Lis founded

Births
5 February – Cristiano Ronaldo, footballer.
24 March – Frederico Gil, tennis player

22 April – Diana Piedade, singer
25 May – Luciana Abreu, singer
25 September – Vânia Fernandes, singer
11 November – Raquel Guerra, singer
8 December – Emanuel Silva, canoer.

Deaths
7 May – Carlos Mota Pinto, law professor and politician (born 1936)

References

 
1980s in Portugal
Portugal
Years of the 20th century in Portugal
Portugal